Liparis crenulata is a species of orchid endemic to Sumatra and Java.

References

crenulata
Taxa named by Carl Ludwig Blume

Terrestrial orchids